The Trebel is a river in Western Pomerania, a region of Mecklenburg-Vorpommern, some 75 kilometers long. The Poggendorf Trebel (source Klein Zarnewanz) and Beek (source in Wittenhagen) are the sources of the river and merge in Grimmen. The Trebel then runs near Quitzin, merges with the Blinde Trebel near Franzburg, is connected to the Recknitz River by a ditch near Tribsees, merges with the Warbel River near Bassendorf (part of Deyelsdorf), then constitutes the historical border between Mecklenburg and Pomerania, and merges into the Peene River near Demmin. Ibitzgraben, Ibitzbach, and Roter Brückengraben are ditches connecting the Trebel and Peene rivers near their confluence.

External links 

Description of the Trebel River (German)

Rivers of Mecklenburg-Western Pomerania
Pomerania
Rivers of Germany